Diplotaxis viminea also known by the common name Vineyard wall rocket is a species of annual herb in the family Brassicaceae. They have a self-supporting growth form and simple, broad leaves. Individuals can grow to 5.8 cm tall. It forms a basal rosette of leaves and flowering stems with or without leaves. It blooms June through October in western Europe, but may have an extended flowering period of up to eight months elsewhere in its range. This species grows in fields and vineyards and It is considered by some to be a weed of vegetable crops, vineyards, and gardens.

Sources

References 

viminea
Flora of Malta